Jerzy Bandura (14 November 1915 – 19 October 1987) was a Polish sculptor. A poster he designed in 1947 won him an international award from the United Nations. His work entitled "Crawl" was also part of the sculpture event in the art competition at the 1948 Summer Olympics. In 1945, he taught sculpture at the Academy of Fine Arts in Kraków, becoming a professor in 1959. A work he completed in 1960 was described as one of the "most outstanding Polish spatial and architectural monuments".

Gallery

References

External links
 

1915 births
1987 deaths
20th-century Polish sculptors
Polish male sculptors
20th-century Polish male artists
Olympic competitors in art competitions
People from Nowy Targ County